A buffalo jump, or sometimes bison jump, is a cliff formation which Indigenous peoples of North America historically used to hunt and kill plains bison in mass quantities.  The broader term game jump refers to a man-made jump or cliff used for hunting other game, such as reindeer.

Method of the hunt
Hunters herded the bison and drove them over the cliff, breaking their legs and rendering them immobile. Tribe members waiting below closed in with spears and bows to finish the kills. The Blackfoot people called the buffalo jumps "pishkun", which loosely translates as "deep blood kettle". This type of hunting was a communal event that occurred as early as 12,000 years ago. They believed that if any buffalo escaped these killings then the rest of the buffalo would learn to avoid humans, which would make hunting even harder.

Buffalo jump sites are often identified by rock cairns, which were markers designating "drive lanes", by which bison would be funneled over the cliff. These drive lanes would often stretch for several miles.

Buffalo jump sites yield significant archaeological evidence because processing sites and camps were always nearby. The sites yield information as to how the Native Americans used the bison for food, clothing, and shelter. Plains Indians, in particular, depended on the bison for their survival. Every part of the animal could be used in some way: hides for clothes and shelter, bones for tools, sinews for bowstrings and laces. Hooves could be ground for glue, and the brains could be used in the tanning process for the hides. The extra meat was preserved as pemmican.

In one of his journals, Meriwether Lewis describes how a buffalo jump was practiced during the Lewis and Clark Expedition:

one of the most active and fleet young men is selected and disguised in a robe of buffalo skin... he places himself at a distance between a herd of buffalo and a precipice proper for the purpose; the other Indians now surround the herd on the back and flanks and at a signal agreed on all show themselves at the same time moving forward towards the buffalo; the disguised Indian or decoy has taken care to place himself sufficiently near the buffalo to be noticed by them when they take to flight and running before them they follow him in full speed to the precipice; the Indian (decoy) in the mean time has taken care to secure himself in some cranny in the cliff... the part of the decoy I am informed is extremely dangerous.

Despite having described a jump in detail, neither Lewis nor any white settlers are known to have personally witnessed the events.

Historical sites

Sites of interest include Head-Smashed-In, Bonfire Shelter, Ulm Pishkun, Madison Buffalo Jump, Dry Island, Glenrock, Big Goose Creek, Cibolo Creek, Vore, Too Close for Comfort Site (also known as Wahkpa Chu'gn Site), Olsen-Chubbuck Bison Kill Site, and Camp Disappointment of the Lewis and Clark Expedition.

Ulm Pishkun Buffalo Jump is likely the largest buffalo jump in the world. It was used by the Native Americans in the area between 900 and 1500 AD. Ulm Pishkun Buffalo Jump is located in First Peoples Buffalo Jump State Park in Cascade County, Montana, north-northwest of the community of Ulm.

Madison Buffalo Jump State Park is a Montana state park in Gallatin County, Montana in the United States. The park is named for a canyon cliff used by Native Americans as a buffalo jump, where herds of bison were stampeded over the cliff as an efficient means of slaughter. This limestone cliff was used for 2,000 years by Native Americans. Madison Buffalo Jump State Park is a day use-only park. It is open year-round for hiking, wildlife observation, and some picnicking.

Camp Disappointment, the northernmost point of the Lewis and Clark Expedition, is among the best-preserved buffalo jumps in Montana, due to its relatively inaccessible location. The creek at the bottom of the cliff periodically exposes animal bones.

There is a 3-D reconstruction of Charles M. Russell's painting of a buffalo jump on display at the Helena State Capital Museum, Helena, Montana.

See also

Bison hunting
Game drive system
Petroform
Desert kite

References

Bison hunting
Hunting in Canada
Hunting in the United States
Archaeology of Canada
Canadian Prairies
First Nations history
Archaeological sites in the United States
Western United States
Native American history

Hunting methods
Stone age sites
Archaeological sites in Montana